King's Highway 402, commonly referred to as Highway 402 and historically as the Blue Water Bridge Approach, is a 400-series highway in the Canadian province of Ontario that connects the Blue Water Bridge international crossing near Sarnia to Highway 401 in London. It is one of multiple trade links between Ontario and the Midwestern United States. It is four lanes for much of its length, though the approach to the Blue Water Bridge is six lanes.

Although Highway 402 was one of the original 400-series highways when it was designated in 1953, the freeway originally merged into Highway 7 near the present Highway 40 interchange in what was, at the time, Sarnia Township. In 1972, construction began to extend Highway 402 from Sarnia to Highway 401 near London thus creating a bypass to Highway 7; construction took over a decade. The final section of the extension, between Highway 81 and Highway 2, opened to traffic in 1982. The removal of an intersection at Front Street in Sarnia made the entire route a controlled-access highway.

Motorists crossing into Michigan at the western end have direct access to Interstate 69 (I-69) and Interstate 94 (I-94) into Port Huron; motorists crossing onto the Canadian side from the east end of I-69 and I-94 have access to Toronto via Highway 401, and onwards to Montreal via A-20 in Quebec. The only town along Highway 402 between Sarnia and London is Strathroy.

Route description 

Highway 402 begins on the Canadian side of the Blue Water Bridge. Across the St. Clair River, Highway 402 continues in Michigan as I-69 and I-94. The twin bridge crossing has six lanes of traffic and non-stop freeway access.
This provides a quicker route than the busier Ambassador Bridge crossing in Windsor, which features over ten traffic lights leading to the four-lane bridge, although that situation is expected to be rectified after the planned Gordie Howe International Bridge is constructed.
Although Highway 402 passes through Sarnia, it is not intended to operate as a commuter highway; at Highway 40 and westward all ramps leading to the westbound lanes of the freeway were originally signed as "Bridge To U.S.A." without reference to Highway 402, though these have been replaced in the early 2000s with signs saying "402 West Bridge To U.S.A.".

After descending over the village of Point Edward and passing through a customs plaza, the freeway curves as it crosses Front Street (former Highway 40B) and a former railway line.  Running north of the former Holmes Foundry (closed in 1988 by owner Chrysler), the route then becomes parallel to and north of Exmouth Street as it dives under the Christina Street overpass and enters the City of Sarnia.

East of the Murphy Road underpass, the freeway curves to the northeast to bypass its original alignment. It crosses the Howard Watson Nature Trail, a mixed-use recreational trail that was converted from a Canadian National Railway (CNR) line in 1988.
The highway curves back to its east–west orientation at an interchange with Highway 40 (Modeland Road). It passes south of Sarnia Chris Hadfield Airport before exiting the city limits at Mandaumin Road (Lambton Road 26).

Now parallel and north of London Line, the former route of Highway 7 (the predecessor route between Sarnia and London),
the freeway jogs north to travel along the back lot line of farmland fronting London Line and the concession road north of Highway 402. The highway split at least one farm in half during its construction, with the family’s barn being burned down to make way for the construction. The freeway passes by a truck inspection station (eastbound traffic only) and truck rest area (westbound traffic only, formerly a truck inspection station) before being crossed by Camlachie Road. It meets Lambton County Road 21 (Oil Heritage Road), the northern terminus of the Oil Heritage Route, north of the town of Wyoming. The county road is also a former southern extension of Highway 21, which itself begins as Forest Road  to the east. Highway 21 is also known as the Bluewater Route, as most of its length is parallel to the shore of Lake Huron.

After passing an interchange with Forest Road, the freeway is crossed by London Line and momentarily diverges from its straight alignment to dip south of Warwick.
Shortly thereafter it curves to the southeast and zig-zags towards London, bisecting farms and dividing woodlands. The freeway passes to the west of the town of Delaware and curves east. It enters London and meets interchanges with Highway 4 south of Lambeth, as well as with Wonderland Road before merging into Highway 401. Access to westbound and from eastbound Highway 401 is provided via Highway 4 or Wonderland Road.

The freeway generally uses Parclo A2 and Parclo B2 designs for interchanges. Exceptions include the Front Street interchange in Sarnia, which is a hybrid of a diamond and Parclo B2 interchange (previously a Parclo AB2 until the mid-2000s), and the Highway 40 interchange which is a Parclo B-4. There is presently no interchange using the full six ramp Parclo A4 layout (a common design on other Ontario freeways) on the entirety of Highway 402; although several interchanges do have five ramps, while the junction with Indian Road was previously a Parclo A4 until the directional ramp in the NW quadrant was removed and replaced with a signalized left turn in the late 1990s.

History 
Planning for the route that would become Highway 402 began following the completion of the Blue Water Bridge in 1938. A divided highway was constructed through Sarnia following World War II; it was completed and designated in 1953. The Department of Highways announced its intent to extend the route to Highway 401 in 1957. However, while some preliminary work began in the early 1960s, it would take until 1968 for a preferred route to be announced, and until 1972 for construction to begin. Work was carried out through the remainder of the 1970s, and the freeway was completed and ceremonially opened in late 1982. Since completion as a four-lane route, expansion work has been concentrated on the portion of the freeway in Sarnia approaching the border crossing.

Construction 
Highway 402 is one of the original 400-series highways. It was numbered in 1953, a year after Highway 400 and Highway 401.
The short  dual highway was built as an approach to the Blue Water Bridge, which itself opened to traffic October 10, 1938.
As such, the highway was named the Blue Water Bridge Approach. Construction began in 1939. However, like many other road projects, World War II halted construction. In 1947 a new survey was undertaken; construction resumed by 1952. The approach road was opened in 1953, at which point the route was designated Highway 402. It featured an interchange with Christina Street and at-grade intersections with Front Street, Indian Road and Modeland Road (the Highway 40 Sarnia bypass); after Modeland Road the route continued to London as Highway 7.

Ultimately, Highway 402 was designated with the intent of extending it to Highway 401. This was formally announced by the Department of Highways in late 1957.
Construction on a new grade-separated intersection with Modeland Road began in 1963 and opened in 1964, although as before Highway 402 still continued eastward as Highway 7.
On February 28, 1968, a  extension towards London was officially announced by Minister of Highways George Gomme.
It was decided to construct the extension on a new right-of-way, as had been done with most freeways constructed after Highway 400. East of the Murphy Road overpass, Highway 402 was re-aligned to bypass the interchange with Highway 40 constructed in 1964; Exmouth Street was redirected to connect with Highway 7 (London Line) at that junction, and Quinn Street now follows the former routing of Highway 402.
For the new Highway 402, an overpass crossing was required with the then-CNR line (now the Howard Watson Nature Trail) and a Parclo B4 interchange with the newly twinned Highway 40 just north of the 1964 interchange. Construction east of Highway 40 began in 1972.

A third contract to bridge the gap between that project and Sarnia was awarded in 1975.
On October 13, 1978, Highway 402 was opened to traffic between Highway 40 and Highway 21.
By the end of that year, construction was progressing on the section between Highway 21 and Highway 81 near Strathroy, as well as on the section connecting Highway 2 with Highway 401.
The section between Highway 21 and Highway 81 north of Strathroy was the next to be completed; it was opened to traffic on November 26, 1979.
On November 17, 1981, the section between London and Delaware was completed, including the interchange at Highway 401. It forced westbound drivers to exit at Longwoods Road (Highway 2). Construction was already underway on the final section between Strathroy and Delaware at this point.

The opening of the section between Highways 2 and 81 completed Highway 402 from London to the Blue Water Bridge. In addition, the removal of the Front Street intersection in Sarnia made the entire route a controlled-access highway. Both were completed in time for the official opening in Sarnia on November 10, 1982.

Since completion 
In 1997, noise barriers were erected upon both sides of the highway between Colborne Road to just east of the Howard Watson Trail. At the Indian Road interchange, the directional ramp in the NW quadrant was removed and replaced with a signalized left turn for the NE quadrant loop ramp, enabling a continuous noise barrier to be placed in place of the former directional ramp. However, the Sarnia-Lambton Chamber of Commerce was concerned that the new noise barriers would cause travelers to overlook the city. A partnership was formed between the municipality and the Ontario Ministry of Transportation to make additional aesthetic improvements to the highway corridor within the city that would be funded by the community, including a "City of Sarnia" landscaped sign that was completed in 2001.

In 2007, the southern part of the Front Street interchange was realigned. It was originally a parclo AB2 (folded diamond) configuration when it opened in 1982, since Highway 402 needed to cross a railway as well as Front Street; however the railway has since been removed by the 1990s allowing a new on-ramp to Highway 402 eastbound to be built in the SE quadrant. For the overpass carrying eastbound highway traffic, the acceleration lane which previously served the now-removed loop ramp in the SW quadrant was instead allocated to a new on-ramp from the Canada Border Services Agency secondary inspection; previously transport trucks exiting the customs plaza had to make a right-turn from Marina Road to the highway which caused considerable congestion.

On Monday, December 13, 2010, a whiteout caused by lake-effect snow squalls left an  stretch of Highway 402 closed for several days.
Lambton County officials declared a state of emergency. Although the entire distance between Sarnia and London is subject to occasional snow squalls and whiteout conditions, they usually dissipate or move in less than a day. The exceptional conditions at that time were caused by a snow squall which remained stationary over several days, dropping up to two metres (6 ft) of snow in some parts of the area. Defence Minister Peter MacKay sent two Canadian Forces Griffon helicopters and a C-130 Hercules to Sarnia to aid in the search-and-rescue efforts.
The hospitality of locals in providing shelter for stranded motorists was the primary focus of local media coverage.
The highway was reopened to traffic on the morning of December 16.
A single death was reported; a man succumbed to hypothermia on a nearby county road.

Highway 402 was widened in the Sarnia area from four to six lanes due to extensive traffic backups from the bridge crossing towards the USA; the westbound lanes were widened by two lanes, while eastbound capacity remains unchanged. The new four-lane roadway is divided into specific lanes for cars, trucks, local traffic, and NEXUS card holders.
The new lanes begin just before the Murphy Road overpass with a local lane breaking away for interchange access; all travellers wishing to exit the highway from this point must be travelling in this lane.
Construction began August 4, 2009,
between the Blue Water Bridge and Lambton County Road 26 (Mandaumin Road) and included the reconstruction of several bridges, as well as completely rebuilding the Christina Street exit to accommodate southbound access. Work was completed by the end of 2012. Between 2004 and 2013, the speed limit along the westbound lanes from Airport Road westward was reduced from the standard . However, following the reconstruction, the speed limit was raised between Indian Road and Airport Road on June 20, 2013.

On January 5, 2013, a temporary vehicular roadblock was created at the Blue Water Bridge as part of the "Idle No More" protests by First Nations groups. The blockade was known in advance and was planned to occur during the noon hour. Lambton OPP monitored the protest by walking alongside the protesters. Traffic resumed flowing normally by 1:30 p.m.  While Highway 402 itself was not closed, the protest did back up traffic onto the highway causing congestion in the areas of Front Street and Christina Street.
Later that year, another protest was held west of Strathroy on October 19, advocating against wind turbine construction due to the health effects experienced by those living near them. The rolling protest of about 150 vehicles, including farm equipment, was monitored by the OPP and required intermittent ramp closures to the westbound lanes.

On November 23, 2015, the Indian Road overpass was damaged by an flatbed trailer carrying an over-height load. The eastbound lanes of the highway were closed for 60 hours, while the girders damaged in the impact had to be removed, while the overpass reopened for Indian Road traffic which was reduced to two lanes for the next few months. The overpass was repaired by May 2016 at a cost of $554,000 (overall damage of $3 million). The trucking company, under the Highway Traffic Act, was held liable and had to compensate the Ministry of Transportation of Ontario for the repair costs.

Exit list

Notes

References

External links 

Highway 402 @ Asphaltplanet.ca
Video of the entire route of Highway 402
Video of Highway 402 and Bluewater Bridge in Sarnia

02
Roads in London, Ontario
Transport in Sarnia